Bughea de Sus is a commune in Argeș County, Muntenia, Romania. It is composed of a single village, Bughea de Sus. The village was part of Albeștii de Muscel Commune, as well as being the commune center, until 2004, when it was split off.

References

Communes in Argeș County
Localities in Muntenia